Edward Sandford Martin (2 January 1856 – 13 June 1939) was an American journalist and editor.

Biography
Edward S. Martin was born in 1856 on his grand-uncle Enos T. Throop's estate "Willowbrook" near Auburn, New York. The youngest son in his parents' large and socially prominent family, Edward S. Martin completed his secondary education in 1872 at Phillips Academy and in 1877 graduated with a bachelor's degree from Harvard University, where in 1876 he was one of the founders of the Harvard Lampoon.

In 1883 he became the first literary editor of Life Magazine; from 1887 to 1933 he was the chief editorial writer for Life Magazine. From 1920 to 1935 he wrote the column "Easy Chair" for Harper's Magazine.

In 1884 he was admitted to the bar at Rochester, New York. From 1885 to 1893 he was Assistant Editor for the Rochester Union and Advertiser. In 1896 he moved with his family to New York City. In 1886, he married and in 1907 three children from the marriage were alive.

Martin's sister Emily Norwood Martin Upton (1846–1870) married military strategist General Emory Upton (1839–1881) in 1868, but died of consumption two years later.

Selected publications

 

 

as editor:

References

External links

1856 births
1939 deaths
American magazine journalists
American magazine editors
Phillips Academy alumni
Harvard University alumni
Life (magazine) people
People from Cayuga County, New York
Journalists from New York (state)
The Harvard Lampoon alumni